Bill Nagy (1921–1973) was a Canadian-born film and television actor who settled and worked in Britain. He began working on the London stage, appearing in the West End production of South Pacific.

Selected filmography
Film

 A Tale of Five Cities (1951) - G.I. at Table (uncredited)
 River Beat (1954) - Eddie
 Hands of Destiny (1954) - Captain Scott
 The Brain Machine (1955) - Charlie
 Shadow of a Man (1955) - Paul Bryant
 Joe MacBeth (1955) - Marty
 The Stolen Airliner (1955) - Luiz
 Cloak Without Dagger (1956) - Mario Oromonda
 Fire Maidens from Outer Space (1956) - U.S.Officer (uncredited)
 Assignment Redhead (1956) - Marzotti
 The Eternal Question (1956)
 High Tide at Noon (1957) - Sandy McNab (uncredited)
 Confess, Killer (1957) - John Digby
 Across the Bridge (1957) - Paul Scarff
 A King in New York (1957) - Television Announcer (uncredited)
 The Mark of the Hawk (1957) - Fred
 Man with a Gun (1958) - Joe Harris
 I Was Monty's Double (1958) - American Captain
 Dial 999 (TV series), ('Picture Puzzle', episode) (1959) - West
 First Man Into Space (1959) - Police Chief Wilson
 The Mouse That Roared (1959) - U.S. Policeman (uncredited)
 Bobbikins (1959) - Rogers - The Butler
 Our Man in Havana (1959) - Man at Blue Moon Club (uncredited)
 Never Take Sweets from a Stranger (1960) - Clarence Olderberry Jr
 The Boy Who Stole a Million (1960) - Police Chief
 Surprise Package (1960) - Johnny Stettina (uncredited)
 Transatlantic (1960) - Fabroni
 The Long Shadow (1961) - Garity
 Crosstrap (1962) - Gaunt
 The Road to Hong Kong (1962) - Agent (uncredited)
 The Longest Day (1962) - Major in Ste. Mère-Eglise (uncredited)
 Danger by My Side (1962) - Sam Warren
 Night of the Prowler (1962) - Paul Conrad
 The Girl Hunters (1963) - Georgie
 Goldfinger (1964) - Mr. Midnight
 Boy with a Flute (1964) (Short)
 Those Magnificent Men in their Flying Machines (1965) - American Journalist (uncredited)
 Where the Spies Are (1966) - Aeradio
 A Countess from Hong Kong (1967) - Crawford
 You Only Live Twice (1967) - USAF General at Pentagon (uncredited)
 The Man Outside (1967) - Morehouse
 Battle Beneath the Earth (1967) - Col. Talbot Wilson
 The White Bus (1967)
 Subterfuge (1968) - Embassy Attache
 The Adding Machine (1969) - Lawyer
 The Revolutionary (1970) - Gansard
 Z.P.G. (1972) - The President
 Scorpio (1973) - The owner of the pet shop (uncredited) (final film role)

Television
 Overseas Press Club - Exclusive! (1957) - Pierre J. Huss
 The Adventures of Clint and Mac (1957) - Clint's Father
 Coronation Street (1961-1970) - Gregg Flint / Joe Baumgarten
 Sir Francis Drake (1962) - Corsia
 The Saint (1962-1964) - Tony Unciello / Joe Sholto / David Stern
 The Avengers (1963) - Johnson
 Crane (1964) - Venza
 Never Mind the Quality, Feel the Width (1969) - Lyndon
 Madigan (1972) - Ross

 References 

 Bibliography 
 Hare, William. Early Film Noir: Greed, Lust and Murder Hollywood Style''. McFarland, 2010.

External links 
 

1921 births
1973 deaths
Canadian male film actors
British male film actors
Canadian male television actors
British male television actors
Canadian emigrants to the United Kingdom